

The Commonwealth Railways CA class was a class of  steam locomotives purchased by the Commonwealth Railways, Australia, from the New York, New Haven and Hartford Railroad (NH), USA, through Lend-Lease during World War II.

The two locomotives in the class, CA78 and CA79, had been built in 1907 and 1905, respectively, by Baldwin Locomotive Works, Philadelphia, USA, and had been part of NH's G-4a class. They arrived in Australia in August 1943 and were used on the Trans-Australian Railway. CA78 was withdrawn in 1945 and CA79 in 1950. Both were scrapped in 1956.

References

Notes

Bibliography

External links

CA class
Railway locomotives introduced in 1943
Baldwin locomotives
4-6-0 locomotives
Standard gauge locomotives of Australia
New York, New Haven and Hartford Railroad locomotives
Scrapped locomotives
Standard gauge locomotives of the United States